The 1980 United States Olympic trials for track and field were held at Hayward Field in Eugene, Oregon. These were the first such trials organized by the new national governing body for the sport of track and field, The Athletics Congress formed one year earlier as required by the Amateur Sports Act of 1978.  Previous trials had been organized by the AAU.  The eight-day competition lasted from June 21 until June 29.

Unlike any of the previous or subsequent years, the Olympic trials in 1980 did not select representatives to the 1980 Summer Olympics.  By this point in the year, President Jimmy Carter had already announced the 1980 Summer Olympics boycott in protest of the Soviet invasion of Afghanistan and its flagrant human rights violations.  This affected the competition.  Some athletes did not compete or did not persevere through illness or injury as they might have if Olympic bids were on the line.  Subsequently, some athletes, notably Tom Hintnaus and Gary Fanelli, chose to compete for other countries.  Others like Franklin Jacobs retired.

The only qualifiers to another meet from this meet came from two women's exhibition events, the 400 m hurdles and 5000 meters, who were invited to the 1980 World Championships in Athletics.  Many of the top 3 from this meet ran in the alternative to the Olympics, the Liberty Bell Classic, a few weeks later.

The trials for the men's and women's marathon were held May 24 in Buffalo, New York, and the trials for the men's 50 km race walk were held May 10 in Niagara Falls, New York.

Men's results
Key:
.

Men track events

Men field events

Notes

Women's results

Women track events

Women field events

External links
Men's 5000m Highlights 
Heptathlon and women's shot put Highlights

References

US Olympic Trials
Track, Outdoor
United States Summer Olympics Trials
Olympic Trials (track and field)
Olympic Trials (track and field)